"Bigger Than Me" is a song by English singer and songwriter Louis Tomlinson released on 1 September 2022. It was released as the lead single from his second studio album Faith in the Future.

Background
In a statement, Louis Tomlinson said;

The song was written by Tomlinson, Rob Harvey, and Red Triangle, while production was handled by Mike Crossey. The song is about Tomlinson questioning what really he wants to become and how we change while growing up, as life brings new challenges.

Live performances
Tomlinson performed the song live at The Late Late Show with James Corden. He also performed the song live on Good Morning America. On 30 September 2022, Tomlinson released a live version of the single that was performed in Milan, Italy.

Music video
The music video for "Bigger Than Me" was released on 2 September 2022. Billboard magazine describes the video which showcases, "Tomlinson walking through stunning, lush outdoor landscapes lit by the setting sun and collecting stray pieces of wood along his way. When he eventually reaches a bonfire — the sun fully down — he tosses the wood into the flames and watches them burn."

Commercial performance
"Bigger Than Me" debuted at number 56 on the UK Singles Downloads Chart and peaked at number 39. The song also peaked at number 38 on the Billboard Pop Airplay chart and the Hot Trending Songs chart at number 14.

Track listing

Personnel
Musicians

Louis Tomlinson – vocals
Stephen Sesso – guitar
Dan Crean – drums, percussion
Mike Crossey – keyboards, bass

Production

Mike Crossey – programming, sound engineering
Red Triangle – vocal producer
Dick Beetham – sound engineering
Dan Grech-Marguerat – sound engineering

Charts

Release history

References

2022 singles
2022 songs
Louis Tomlinson songs
Songs written by Louis Tomlinson